Century International Arms is an importer and manufacturer of firearms that is based in the United States. The company was founded in 1961 in St. Albans, Vermont,
with offices in Montreal. In 1995, the company headquarters and sales staff moved to Boca Raton, Florida and to Delray Beach, Florida in 2004.

History
The company was started after William Sucher, a typewriter repairman, took a Lee–Enfield rifle in trade against a typewriter he had repaired for a customer. Having no need for the rifle, he posted a newspaper  to sell it and received more queries about the rifle than he had for typewriters. He then sought sources of surplus rifles that he could sell for a profit.

With his brother-in-law, Manny Weigensberg, Sucher made contacts in foreign countries for the importation of military surplus rifles and handguns and by the 1970s, Century became the single largest importer of firearms in the United States and Canada.

When sources of importable surplus firearms have become scarce, Century has manufactured their own firearms. The company has manufactured versions of the G3, L1A1, AK-47 and sporterized Mausers among others. The company also imports Turkish-made Canik pistols.

Firearms

Canik 

 Mete SFt
 Mete SFx
 SFx Rival
 TP9  (clone of Walther P99)
 TP9 SF
 TP9 SFx
 TP9 SA
 TP9 v2
 TP40 v2
 TP9 SF Elite
 TP9 Elite Combat 
 TP9 Elite Combat Executive 
 TP9 Elite SC
 TP9 DA
 TP9 SFL

Others 
C308 (a clone of the CETME rifle)
C39/C39V2 (clones of the AK-47)
L1A1
RAS47 (clone of the AKM) 
SKS rifle
SSG 82
vz. 24
vz. 50
WASR-series rifles
Zastava M57
Zastava M70
 VSKA (clone of the AKM)
 BFT-47 (AKM clone with RPK-style front trunnion)

Ammunition
In addition to importing bulk surplus ammunition, Century is the US importer and distributor for Red Army Standard Ammunition.

References

Firearm importation companies of the United States
Firearm manufacturers of the United States